The 1989 Liga Semi-Pro Divisyen 1 season is the inaugural season of Liga Semi-Pro Divisyen 1. A total of nine teams participated in the season.

The teams were based from nine best performing teams from 1988 Malaysian League season.

Under the new format, only the top six teams in Divisyen 1 and the Divisyen 2 champions and runners-up will be involved in the Malaysia Cup. Malaysia Cup was played from the quarter-final stage, scheduled for November after the league was finished. The Malaysia Cup quarter-final and semi-final matches will be played on a home and away basis.

The season kicked off on 1 July 1989. Selangor ended up the season by winning the title.

Teams
Nine teams competing in the first season of Liga Semi-Pro Divisyen 1.

 Selangor (Liga Semi-Pro Divisyen 1 champions)
 Kuala Lumpur
 Kedah
 Pahang
 Johor
 Sarawak
 Singapore
 Penang (Relegated to Liga Semi-Pro Divisyen 2)
 Kelantan (Relegated to Liga Semi-Pro Divisyen 2)

Bahagian 1

Champions

References

Liga Semi-Pro Divisyen 1 seasons
1
Malaysia